Palaquium beccarianum is a tree in the family Sapotaceae. It is named for the Italian naturalist Odoardo Beccari.

Description
The bark is reddish brown. The inflorescences bear up to five flowers.

Distribution and habitat
Palaquium beccarianum is endemic to Borneo. Its habitat is mostly in lowland mixed dipterocarp forests.

References

beccarianum
Endemic flora of Borneo
Trees of Borneo
Plants described in 1890